Writers on Comics Scriptwriting is book series published by Titan Books containing interviews from top comic book writers about their writing techniques and principal works. Volume 1 was written by Mark Salisbury, and Volume 2 was written by Andrew Kardon and Tom Root.

Interviewees

Volume 1
Volume 1 contains interviews with:

Kurt Busiek
Peter David
Chuck Dixon
Warren Ellis
Garth Ennis
Neil Gaiman
Devin Grayson
Dan Jurgens
Joe Kelly
Jeph Loeb
Todd McFarlane
Frank Miller
Grant Morrison
Mark Waid

Volume 2
Volume 2 contains interviews with:

Brian Azzarello
Brian Michael Bendis
Ed Brubaker
Mike Carey
Andy Diggle
Paul Dini
Peter Milligan
Mark Millar
Mike Mignola
Geoff Johns
Bruce Jones
Greg Rucka
Dave Sim
Kevin Smith
Jill Thompson
Brian K. Vaughan
Bill Willingham

References

2002 non-fiction books
2004 non-fiction books
Books about comics